Inserra Supermarkets Inc. is a supermarket chain operating in the northeastern United States. The company is a member of the Wakefern retailers' cooperative and does business as ShopRite and PriceRite. Inserra Supermarkets is headquartered in Mahwah, New Jersey, and operates approximately 23 stores. It is a family-owned business and is one of the 500 largest private companies in the United States. The Chairman and CEO of Inserra Supermarkets is Lawrence R. Inserra Jr.

See also
 ShopRite (United States)
 Wakefern Food Corporation
 PriceRite

References

Mahwah, New Jersey
Companies based in Bergen County, New Jersey
Supermarkets of the United States